Trent Dennis-Lane (born 30 August 1988) is a former professional Australian rules footballer who played for the Sydney Swans and St Kilda Football Club in the Australian Football League (AFL).

Playing career

2010-12: Career with Sydney
Dennis-Lane was drafted to Sydney with the 55th selection in the 2009 AFL Draft. He had previously been playing with Subiaco Football Club in the West Australian Football League and trained with Fremantle in the leadup to the draft.

Dennis-Lane was a quality medium forward who could play as both a crumbing small forward and in a lead-up role. Quick and evasive with great goal sense. In 2009, he kicked 66 goals in WAFL including four in the grand final.

Dennis-Lane, often referred to as TDL by Swans' fans, made his debut against Richmond at the MCG, kicking one goal. Having returned to the side after being dropped, Dennis-Lane showed some very impressive form towards the end of that year. He kicked 4 goals against the Western Bulldogs at the SCG and then another 4 goals against Carlton in the Elimination Final at ANZ Stadium. His chase and tackle on Dennis Armfield in the final quarter in the lead up to his 4th goal was one of the highlights of the year and sealed victory for the Swans.

2013-14: Career with St Kilda
On 26 October 2012, Dennis-Lane was traded to St Kilda. Now plays for the Sandringham Zebras and is sponsored by Two Locals in Black Rock.

Personal life
Dennis-Lane is of Burmese descent, with his father moving to Australia at age 13.

References

External links

WAFL playing statistics

Sydney Swans players
Living people
1988 births
Subiaco Football Club players
Australian people of Burmese descent
Australian rules footballers from Western Australia
St Kilda Football Club players
Sandringham Football Club players